Lebanese people in Cyprus include immigrants and descendants of immigrants from Lebanon, numbering approximately 20,000 people of Lebanese descent. Migration from Lebanon to Cyprus started as early as the 13th century when Lebanese Maronites first settled in Cyprus and the new migration wave started after 1975 during the Lebanese Civil War. Most of the Lebanese from the new migration wave came from Koura District in North Lebanon, which is mostly a Greek Orthodox area. During the Civil War the number of Lebanese was higher, however after the end of the war many returned to Lebanon.

Notable people
Marcos Baghdatis, Cypriot tennis player, Lebanese father and Greek Cypriot mother
Sarbel, British singer, Greek Cypriot father and Lebanese mother

See also 
 Cyprus–Lebanon relations
 List of Lebanese people in Cyprus
 Lebanese people in Greece, ca. 30,000 people
 Maronites in Cyprus
 Our Lady of Grace Cathedral (Nicosia)
 Arabs in Greece
 Greeks in Lebanon

 
 
Muslim communities in Europe